Claude Aubriet (c. 1665 or 1651 – 3 December 1742) was a French illustrator and botanical artist.

Biography 

Aubriet was born in Châlons-en-Champagne or in Moncetz.

He was a botanical illustrator at the Jardin du Roi in Paris. There Joseph Pitton de Tournefort (1656–1708) noticed his work and commissioned him as illustrator of his 1694 Elemens de Botanique. From 1700 to 1702 he accompanied Tournefort and Andreas von Gundelsheimer on an expedition to the Middle East. There he made drawings of historical sites and the region's flora. After his return to Paris, Aubriet continued his work with the botanists at the Jardin du Roi, contributing to Les Vélins du Roi.

In 1707 Aubriet succeeded Jean Joubert (1643–1707) as the royal botanical painter. He retired in 1735, and was succeeded by Françoise Basseporte (1701–1780), a student of his and a former collaborator. He died in Paris.

Botanist Michel Adanson named the genus Aubrieta in his honour.

Selected works 
Aubriet illustrated two books which were landmarks in the history of botany :
  Joseph Pitton de Tournefort, Institutiones rei herbariae See for example volume 2 of the third edition (with additions by Antoine de Jussieu) of the Institutiones. Paris. Imprimerie Royale : 1719
  Sébastien Vaillant, . Leyde and Amsterdam. Jean & Herman Verbeek and Balthazar Lakeman : 1727.

We also have a number of collections of his drawings:
 Recueil de plantes, fleurs, fruits, oiseaux, insectes et coquillages, etc. peint en miniature sur vélin (Collection of plants, flowers, fruits, birds, insects and shellfish, etc., painted in miniature on vellum)
 Papillons plantes et fleurs (Butterflies plants and flowers)
 Plantes peintes à la gouache (Plants painted in gouache)
 Recueil d'oiseaux (Collection of birds)
 Collection d'aquarelles, 
 Plantes peintes en miniature.

Bibliography 
 
 Jean-Louis De Sloover et Anne-Marie Bogaert-Damin (1999). Les Muscinées du XVIe au XIXe siècle dans les collections de la Bibliothèque universitaire Moretus Plantin, Namur, Presses universitaires de Namur,  
 Aline Hamonou-Mahieu, Claude Aubriet, artiste naturaliste des Lumières, CTHS Sciences

References 

 Parts of this article are based on a translation of an article from the French Wikipedia.

Botanical illustrators
1665 births
1742 deaths